Habrocestum formosum is a jumping spider species in the genus Habrocestum that lives in Zimbabwe. It was first described by Wanda Wesołowska in 2000.

References

Spiders described in 2000
Endemic fauna of Zimbabwe
Salticidae
Spiders of Africa
Taxa named by Wanda Wesołowska